Company Sergeant Major John Henry Williams,  (29 September 1886 – 7 March 1953) was a Welsh colliery worker, soldier, and a recipient of the Victoria Cross (VC) the highest award for gallantry in the face of the enemy that can be awarded to British and Commonwealth forces. Williams is the most decorated Welsh non-commissioned officer of all time.

Early life
Williams was born in Nantyglo, Monmouthshire, on 29 September 1886.

First World War
In November 1914, Williams gave up his employment as a colliery blacksmith and enlisted in the 10th Battalion, South Wales Borderers (part of the 38th (Welsh) Division). He was promoted to sergeant in January 1915.

His citation for the Victoria Cross reads:

Company sergeant major Williams was medically discharged from the army on 17 October 1918 after being severely wounded by shrapnel in the right arm and leg.

In 1919, Williams was invested with his Victoria Cross, Distinguished Conduct Medal, Military Medal and Bar by King George V, the first time that the King had decorated the same man four times in one day. At the time of the investiture Williams had not recovered from his severe wounds, and during the presentation the wound in his arm opened up with the result that medical attention had to be given before he could leave the palace.

Legacy
Williams' grave and memorial are at Ebbw Vale Cemetery. The original headstone was removed during cemetery clearance and a new headstone was erected on 21 October 1990.

In September 2018 the villagers of Villers-Outréaux dedicated an especially commissioned memorial to commemorate him and express their thanks for saving their village from certain destruction.

Bridge of Honour
The 'Jack Williams Gateway Bridge' was unveiled on 21 January 2019, by his great, great granddaughter. It is  160ft. tall, and is part of the new A465 ('Heads of Valleys') road dualling project between Brynmawr and Gilwern, on the westerly-part of the Clydach Gorge.
It weighs just over 738 tons.

Mr Williams' name was chosen for the bridge by 96% of those who participated in the  public vote.

War Medal
Williams' Victoria Cross is displayed at the Regimental Museum of The Royal Welsh, Brecon.

References

External links
C.S.M John Henry Williams V.C. (a Welsh Victoria Cross – biography, extra details & photo)
Location of grave and VC medal (Monmouthshire)

1886 births
1953 deaths
Burials in Wales
Military personnel from Monmouthshire
People from Blaina
South Wales Borderers soldiers
British World War I recipients of the Victoria Cross
Recipients of the Distinguished Conduct Medal
British Army personnel of World War I
Recipients of the Military Medal
British Army recipients of the Victoria Cross
Welsh recipients of the Victoria Cross